Josh McConville is an Australian actor. He was nominated for the 2018 AACTA Award for Best Actor in a Supporting Role for his role in 1%.

Filmography
TV
Mr Inbetween (2019) TV series – Alex (2 episodes)
Home and Away (2017) TV series – Caleb Snow (7 episodes)
Cleverman (2016) TV series – Dickson (3 episodes)
The Killing Field (2014) TV movie – Jackson Ciesolka
Redfern Now (2012) TV series – Photographer (1 episode)
Wild Boys (2011) TV series – Ben Barrett (1 episode)
Underbelly: A Tale of Two Cities (2009) TV series – Michael Hurley (2 episodes)
Film
Elvis (2022) – Sam Phillips
Top End Wedding (2019) – Officer Kent
The Merger (2018) – Snapper
1% (2017) – Skink
War Machine (2017) – Payne (uncredited)Joe Cinque's Consolation (2016) – ChrisDown Under (2016) – GavThe Infinite Man'' (2009) – Dean

References

External links
 

Date of birth missing (living people)
Living people
Australian male film actors
Australian male television actors
Year of birth missing (living people)